HD 84117 is a F-type main sequence star in the constellation of Hydra.  It has an apparent visual magnitude of approximately 4.94.

References

Hydra (constellation)
F-type main-sequence stars
HD, 084117
084117
047592
3862
0364
Durchmusterung objects